Norton is a village in West Northamptonshire. The population including Brokhall and Norton at the 2011 census was 434. Near the village, on Watling Street, is the Roman settlement of Bannaventa.

History
The villages name means 'North farm/settlement'.

Some of the earliest residents of the village were the Romans, who built the Roman settlement of Bannaventa, a Romano-British fortified town on the eastern outskirts of the village located on the Roman road of Watling Street (A5 London to Holyhead road). The settlement's defences were in the form of a trapezium, not aligned with Watling Street, and the enclosure was deeper on the east side of the street than it was on the west.

The defences were built in two – possibly three – phases. The outer ditch was allowed to silt up by the end of the fourth century. Occupation of the site, which may have begun before the Roman conquest, continued into the fourth century.

There is a Roman villa site at the nearby village of Nether Heyford to the south east.

Possible association with Saint Patrick

It is possible, but unsubstantiated, that Bannaventa was the birthplace of St Patrick, the patron saint of Ireland. In his Confessio, Patrick writes:

This could possibly be an alternative name for Bannaventa. In around 405 AD when he was aged 16 he was kidnapped by "pirates" who were raiding the imperial highways, and taken to Ireland as a slave. This view is backed by the fact that the Watling Street ran indirectly to north Wales and thus offered easy passage to Ireland.

The Domesday Book

Norton appears in the Domesday Book and some of the people mentioned in its entry are as follows: Aghmund; Alric; Alvred; Azur; Bisceop; Count Alan; Durand; Edwin; Fredegis; Fulcher; Gilbert; Godwine; Ingelrann; King William as landholder; Leofnoth; Leofric; Leofwine; Lokki; Martin; Nigel; Ordmaer; Osmund; Ralph; Ralph the steward; Robert; Robert, Count of Meulan; Robert, Count of Mortain; Sawata; Scotel; Segrim; Siward; Stenkil; Thorbiorn; Thorir; Walter; William; Wulfmaer.

Village amenities

The village hall is situated near the Parish Church of All Saints. The village has one public house, The White Horse. To the east of the village is a shopping complex in a converted set of farm buildings trading as 'The Heart of the Shires Shopping Village'.

Gallery

References

External links 

District Council

Villages in Northamptonshire
West Northamptonshire District
Civil parishes in Northamptonshire